Arlin Godwin is an electronic musician and filmmaker from Washington, DC.

Early life
Godwin was born and raised in Pensacola, Florida.

Career

Music
Godwin started his career working at a local radio station, before becoming more interested in the music itself. He produced his first album, The Secret Life of Boys, and released it in 2002 after working on it for a year. One of the singles off of the album, "Boy Seventeen", led to him signing to the San Francisco label INgrooves in 2003.

Godwin began performing live in 2004.

Film
Godwin has directed two short films.

Discography
The Secret Life of Boys (2002)
Rush Push (2003)
Remixes, Demos & Bootlegs (2016)

Filmography
The Man in 813 (2011)
Go with the Flow (2012)

References

External links
Official website
Many tracks played on the Sno Jo Radio Podcast

Year of birth missing (living people)
Living people
Place of birth missing (living people)
Musicians from Washington, D.C.
American electronic musicians
American male musicians